The Independent Party of Burkina (PIB) was a political party in Burkina Faso. In 2014 Maxime Kaboré was the chairman of the party.

History
The party failed to win any seats in the 2012 parliamentary elections, in which its national list received 0.25% of the vote.

The party held its first congress in Ouagadougou on 7 and 8 June 2014. It subsequently joined the Republican Front alliance.

References

Defunct political parties in Burkina Faso